Kinsey was a television programme lasting two series, made in 1990/91 and broadcast on BBC 1 in 1991 and 1992. It starred Serena Gordon as Tricia Mabbott, Marian McLoughlin as Judy Kinsey and Leigh Lawson as Neil Kinsey.  The programme was produced at the BBC Pebble Mill Studios.

Premise 
A Midlands lawyer Neil Kinsey, known for being a maverick, takes on a new partner, Tricia Mabbott, who has recently left a larger firm. Kinsey brings an unconventional approach to dealing with his clients' cases, but has to contend with his estranged wife Judy, his rivals, and the potential of romance with Tricia.

All twelve episodes were written by Peter Gibbs.

Cast

Neil Kinsey - Leigh Lawson
Tricia Mabbott - Serena Gordon
Max Barker - David Savile
Gerry Hollis - Eamon Boland
Val - Meera Syal
Keith Schofield - Gavin Richards (Series 1)
Judy Kinsey - Marian McLoughlin (Series 2)
Danny - Mark Williams (Series 2)

Episode list

Series 1 (1991)

Series 2 (1992)

External links

1990s British drama television series
1991 British television series debuts
1992 British television series endings
BBC television dramas
BBC Birmingham productions
1990s British legal television series
English-language television shows
Television shows set in Birmingham, West Midlands